Metro Cammell Weymann Ltd. (MCW), Elmdon, Birmingham, was once a major contributor in transportation manufacturing in the UK and Europe. It was established in 1932 by Metro-Cammell's bus bodybuilding division and Weymann Motor Bodies to produce bus bodies.

MCW bus bodies were built in Metro-Cammell's and Weymann's factories until 1966 when Weymann's factory in Addlestone was closed (the Metro-Cammell and Weymann brand names were discontinued in the same year). From 1977 onward MCW also built bus chassis.

In 1989 the Laird Group decided to sell its bus and rail divisions. No buyer for all of the subdivisions could be found so each product was sold separately to various companies interested in its assets. The Metrorider was bought by Optare who relaunched it as the MetroRider; the Metrobus design was bought by DAF (chassis) and Optare (body), who jointly reworked it into the Optare Spectra. The Metroliner design was acquired by Optare though not pursued. The Metrocab was bought by Reliant. Metro-Cammell's rail division and the Washwood Heath factory went to GEC Alsthom.

Products

Bodies
 London Transport RF 
 London Transport RLH
 Orion series
 London Transport's DMS body built in partnership with Park Royal throughout the 1970s.
 West Midland PTE's standard bus body in the 1970s on both the Daimler/Leyland Fleetline (again built in partnership with Park Royal) and the Bristol VR.
 A generic double deck body range built in the 1970s on Leyland Atlantean and Daimler Fleetline chassis with notable customers being the Merseyside, Tyne & Wear and West Midlands PTE's.

Chassis/Complete buses
Metro-Scania - semi-integral single decker using Scania running units
Metropolitan - semi-integral double decker based on Scania running units
Metrobus - double decker
Mark 1
Mark 2
Mark 2A
Note: also bodied by Alexander (mainly for the Scottish Bus Group and the Merseyside/West Yorkshire PTE's) and Northern Counties (for Greater Manchester PTE)
Metroliner - single and double deck coach
Metroliner - Semi-integral 4.23 m high double deck coach
Metroliner 400GT - integral 4 m high double deck coach
Metroliner - Semi-integral 3.2 m high single deck coach
Metro Hiliner - Integral 3.4 m high single deck coach
Metrorider - midibus

Others
Metrocab - London taxi cab

References

Defunct bus manufacturers of the United Kingdom
Vehicle manufacturing companies established in 1932
1932 establishments in England